Atlas Mill was a cotton spinning mill in the Waterloo district of Ashton-under-Lyne, Greater Manchester, in England. It was built between 1898 and 1900 for the Ashton Syndicate by Sydney Stott of Oldham. It was last mill in Ashton to cease spinning. It was spinning artificial fibres in 1987, and was demolished in 1994; the site is now a housing estate.

Location
Atlas mill was built next to Rock Mill which had been built site of the former Wilshaw Mill, on the junction of Oldham Road and Wilshaw Lane. This had been an unusual site for a mill as it was not close to railways or canals. The water needed to supply the steam engine at Wilshaw Mill came from a reservoir formed by damming the Smallshaw Brook. The reservoir was enlarged when Rock Mill was built.

History
The Minerva Spinning Company Limited was registered in 1891 to build the Minerva Mill at Whitelands. The directors were Messrs Barlow, Marland, Coop, Newton, Pollitt and Pownall; they were later referred to as the Ashton syndicate. In 1891, they built Rock Mill. Then 1898, the syndicate registered the Atlas Mill Co. Ltd, with a capital of £70,000 (£ as of ) to build the Atlas Mill. This was their third mill. The syndicate went on to build Curzon Mill, Tudor Mill, Cedar Mill and finally the Texas Mill.

The cotton industry peaked in 1912 when it produced 8 billion yards of cloth. The Great War of 1914–1918 halted the supply of raw cotton, and the British government encouraged its colonies to build mills to spin and weave cotton. The war over, Lancashire never regained its markets.

On 7 January 1921 all the syndicate's mills went into voluntary liquidation and were passed to the Atlas Mills Ltd group. Atlas Mill was their headquarters. They were struggling. The Bank of England set up the Lancashire Cotton Corporation in 1929 to attempt to rationalise and save the industry. Atlas Mills Limited was taken over by the LCC in 1929. Thus, Atlas Mill was one of 104 mills brought into LCC ownership, and one of the 53 mills that survived through to 1950, where it produced 60 to 100 count mule twist. It closed in 1994 and the site is now a housing estate, part of which was built a number of years before Atlas Mill's closure and was distinguished by a campaign of noise complaint about an establishment of 90 years standing. The roads bear the names Watermill Court and Cedar Mews which gives some indication of their antecedents but will mislead historians about contemporary attitudes.

Architecture
This was a Sydney Stott building. It was four storeys high built on a basement from engineering brick. The large windows were in groups of three, and there was yellow brick decoration. It had a Hotel-de-Ville style water tower. The six  bay engine house, boiler house and chimney were to the north.

Power
The steam engine was by George Saxon & Co, of Openshaw.

Usage
Atlas Mill was used for spinning fine counts  of twists and weft from Egyptian cotton. In 1951 it was spinning Egyptian yarns of counts 60 to 100, using both ring and twist spindles. In 1987 it was spinning & winding artificial fibres.
The latter utilised advanced German designed Schlafhorst Winding Machinery but as late as 1982 Mather & Platt 1897 winding frames were still used as backup.
This can be seen as admirable frugality or as a sign of the make do and mend and lack of investment that resulted in the closure of the Northern Spinning Division.

Owners
 The Ashton syndicate
 Atlas Mills
 Lancashire Cotton Corporation
 Courtauld's Northern Textiles

See also

Textile manufacturing

References

Bibliography

External links
 www.cottontown.org
 www.spinningtheweb.org.uk
 Greater Manchester County Record Office B/CTLD/44/1

Textile mills in Tameside
Buildings and structures in Ashton-under-Lyne
Demolished buildings and structures in Greater Manchester
Buildings and structures demolished in 1994
Textile mills owned by the Lancashire Cotton Corporation